Tanacharison (c. 1700 – 4 October 1754), also called Tanaghrisson, was a Native American leader who played a pivotal role in the beginning of the French and Indian War. He was known to European-Americans as the Half-King, a title also used to describe several other historically important Native American leaders. His name has been spelled in a variety of ways.

Early life
Little is known of Tanacharison's early life. He may have been born into the Catawba tribe about 1700 near what is now Buffalo, New York. As a child, he was taken captive by the French and later adopted into the Seneca tribe, one of the Six Nations of the Iroquois Confederacy. He would later claim that the French boiled and ate his father. His early years were spent on the southeastern shore of Lake Erie in what is now western New York state.

Becoming a leader
Tanacharison first appears in historical records in 1747, living in Logstown (near present Ambridge, Pennsylvania), a multi-ethnic village about 20 miles (30 kilometers) downstream from the forks of the Ohio River. Those Iroquois who had migrated to the Ohio Country were generally known as 'Mingos,' and Tanacharison emerged as a Mingo leader at this time. He also represented the Six Nations at the 1752 Treaty of Logstown, where he was referred to as "Thonariss, called by the English the half King". At this treaty, he spoke on behalf of the Six Nations' Grand Council, but also made clear that the council's ratification was required, in accordance with the Iroquois system of government.

According to the traditional interpretation, the Grand Council had named Tanacharison as leader or "half-king" (a sort of viceroy) to conduct diplomacy with other tribes, and to act as spokesman to the British on their behalf. However, some modern historians have doubted this interpretation, asserting that Tanacharison was merely a village leader, whose actual authority extended no further than his own village. In this view, the title "half king" was probably a British invention, and his "subsequent lofty historical role as a Six Nations 'regent' or 'viceroy' in the Ohio Country was the product of later generations of scholars."

French and Indian War
In 1753, the French began the military occupation of the Ohio Country, driving out British traders and constructing a series of forts. British colonies, however, also claimed the Ohio Country. Robert Dinwiddie, the lieutenant governor of Virginia, sent a young George Washington to travel to the French outposts and demand that the French vacate the Ohio Country. On his journey, Washington's party stopped at Logstown to ask Tanacharison to accompany them as a guide and as a "spokesman" for the Ohio Indians. Tanacharison agreed to return the symbolic wampum he had received from French captain Philippe-Thomas Chabert de Joncaire. Joncaire's first reaction, on learning of this double cross, was to mutter of Tanacharison, "He is more English than the English." But Joncaire masked his anger and insisted that Tanacharison join him in a series of toasts. By the time the keg was empty, Tanacharison was too drunk to hand back the wampum. 

Tanacharison traveled with Washington to meet with Jacques Legardeur de Saint-Pierre, the French commander of Fort Le Boeuf in what is now Waterford, Pennsylvania. There he tried to return the wampum to Saint-Pierre, "who evaded taking it, & made many fair Promises of Love & Friendship; said he wanted to live in Peace & trade amicably with them; as a Proof of which, he wou’d send some Goods immediately down to the Logstown for them."  The French refused to vacate, however, and to Washington's great consternation, they tried to court Tanacharison as an ally. Although fond of their brandy, he remained a strong francophobe.

Tanacharison had requested that the British construct a "strong house" at the Forks of the Ohio and early in 1754 he placed the first log of an Ohio Company stockade there, railing against the French when they captured it.  He was camped at Half King's Rock on May 27, 1754 when he learned of a nearby French encampment and sent word urging an attack to Washington at the Great Meadows, about five miles (8 km) east of Chestnut Ridge in what is now Fayette County, Pennsylvania (near Uniontown). Washington immediately ordered 40 men to join Tanacharison and at sunset followed with a second group, seven of whom got lost in heavy rain that night.  It was dawn on May 28 before Washington reached the Half King's Rock.

After a hurried war council, the English and Tanacharison's eight or nine warriors set off to surround and attack the French in the Battle of Jumonville Glen, who quickly surrendered.  The French commander, Ensign Joseph Coulon de Jumonville, was among the wounded. In one of several disputed and contradictory accounts, it is claimed that Tancharison uttered the French words, "Tu n'es pas encore mort, mon père!" (Thou art not yet dead, my father), then sank his tomahawk in Jumonville's skull, washed his hands with the brains, "and scalped him," but not before eating a portion of Jumonville's brain. Only one of the wounded French soldiers was not killed and scalped among a total of ten dead, 21 captured, and one missing, a man named Monceau who had wandered off to relieve himself that morning.

Monceau witnessed the French surrender before walking barefoot to the Monongahela River and paddling down it to report to Contrecoeur, commanding at Fort Duquesne.  Tanacharison sent a messenger to Contrecoeur the following day with news that the British had shot Jumonville and, but for the Indians, would have killed all the French.  A third (and more accurate) account of the Jumonville Glen encounter was told to Jumonville's half-brother, Captain Louis Coulon de Villiers, by a deserter at the mouth of Redstone Creek during his expedition to avenge his brother's murder.

Washington was without Indian allies on July 3, 1754 at the battle of Fort Necessity, his hastily erected stockade at the Great Meadows. Tanacharison scornfully called the fort "that little thing upon the meadow" and complained that Washington would not listen to advice, and that Washington treated the Indians like slaves. He and another Seneca leader, Queen Aliquippa, had taken their people to Wills Creek. Outnumbered and with supplies running low, Washington surrendered the fort, later blaming Captains George Croghan and Andrew Montour for "involving the country in great calamity".

Relationship with Croghan
Tanacharison had a long relationship with George Croghan, a fur trader, interpreter, and diplomat among the Native Americans who had been appointed a member of the Iroquois' Onondaga Council. Tanacharison had been "one of the sachems who had confirmed Croghan in his land grant of 1749," 200,000 acres minus about two square miles at the Forks of the Ohio for a British fort.  Thomas Penn and Pennsylvania planned to build a stone fort, but Croghan realized that his deeds would be invalid if in Pennsylvania, and had Andrew Montour testify before the Assembly in 1751 that the Indians did not want the fort and that it had all been Croghan's idea, scuttling the project.

In 1752, Croghan was on the Indian council that granted Virginia's Ohio Company permission to build the fort.  Tanacharison's introduction of Croghan to the Virginia commissioners suggests that Croghan organized and led the 1748 Ohio Indian Confederation, which appointed Croghan as the colony's representative in negotiations, and that Pennsylvania recognized as independent of the Six Nations:Brethren, it is a great while since our brother, the Buck (meaning Mr. George Croghan) has been doing business between us, & our brother of Pennsylvania, but we understand he does not intend to do any more, so I now inform you that he is approv'd of by our Council at Onondago, for we sent to them to let them know how he has helped us in our councils here and to let you & him know that he is one of our people and shall help us still & be one of our council, I deliver him this string of wampum.

The Ohio Company fort was surrendered to the French by Croghan's half-brother, Edward Ward, and commanded by his business partner, William Trent. The role of Croghan (who was Pittsburgh's president judge for Virginia and chairman of Pittsburgh's Committee of Safety after Pontiac's War) remains uncertain, since Croghan was later declared a traitor by General Edward Hand and exiled from the frontier.

Last days
Shortly after the battle of Jumonville Glen, Tanacharison moved his people and the old queen Aliquippa east to Croghan's Aughwick plantation in the Aughwick Valley near present Shirleysburg, Pennsylvania.  There Tanacharison became seriously ill and was taken to the farm of John Harris at Paxtang, Pennsylvania (near present-day Harrisburg, Pennsylvania).  He would take no active part in the remainder of the war and died of pneumonia on October 4, 1754. Aliquippa died on December 23, 1754.

Notes

References

Bibliography

Further reading
 
 Lengel, Edward G. General George Washington (2005)
 White, Richard. The middle ground: Indians, empires, and republics in the Great Lakes region, 1650-1815 (1991)

1700s births
1754 deaths
Deaths from pneumonia in Pennsylvania
Indigenous people of the French and Indian War
Native American leaders
Native American people from Pennsylvania
Seneca people